Granja - Carrera 77 is an intermediate station that was part of the TransMilenio mass-transit system of Bogotá, Colombia.

Location
The station was located in northwestern Bogotá, specifically on Calle 80 with Transversal/Carrera 77.

It served the Tisquesusa and La Almería neighborhoods. Through feeder routes it also serves the Serena,  Cerezos, and Florida neighborhoods.

History

In 2000, phase one of the TransMilenio system was opened between Portal de la 80 and Tercer Milenio, including this station.

The station was named Carrera 77 due to its location near the intersection of that road with Calle 80.

In November/2010, the station was intervened and connected with the next one Granja, because of its very high demand. The new station was renamed Granja – Carrera 77.

Station services

Old trunk services/Granja

Old trunk services/Carrera 77

Main Line Service

Feeder routes

The station has connections to the following feeder routes:

Route 5.1 Suba - Rincón
Route 5.3 Serena - Cerezos loop
Route 5.4 Florida loop

The feeder routes 5.2 (Aures-Villamaría loop) and 5.8 (Suba - Compartir loop) were relocated on April 29, 2006 to Portal de Suba.

Inter-city service

This station does not have inter-city service.

External links
TransMilenio

See also
Bogotá
TransMilenio
List of TransMilenio Stations

TransMilenio

es:Granja – Carrera 77 (estación)